Streptomyces cadmiisoli is a bacterium species from the genus of Streptomyces which has been isolated from soil which was contaminated with cadmium.

See also 
 List of Streptomyces species

References 

cadmiisoli
Bacteria described in 2019